Manhunter or Man Hunter may refer to:

Film 
Manhunter (film), a 1986 film based on the novel Red Dragon
 Man Hunter, an alternative title of Devil Hunter (film) (1980)
 The Man Hunter (1930 film) talkie Rin-Tin-Tin adventure film
 The Man Hunter (1919 film), silent western

Television 
The Manhunter, a 1974 TV series set in the 1930s
Manhunters: Fugitive Task Force, a 2008 TV series
 Manhunters (drama), the 2005 British drama which aired on BBC2
 "Manhunter" (Supergirl), a Season 1 episode of American TV Series Supergirl
 "Manhunter" (Brooklyn Nine-Nine), an episode of the seventh season of Brooklyn Nine-Nine

Games 
 Manhunter, a Sierra OnLine adventure game series
Manhunter: New York, a 1988 adventure game by Sierra Entertainment
Manhunter 2: San Francisco
Manhunter (role-playing game), a tabletop role-playing game

Literature 
Manhunter (comics), numerous superheroes and villains from DC Comics
Manhunter (Kate Spencer)
Manhunters (DC Comics), a fictional robot race in the DC Comics Universe

See also
Man the Hunter (1966 symposium) 
Martian Manhunter, a DC Comics character
Sigvard Thurneman, leader of the Sala gangs
 Manhunt (disambiguation)